Robert de Bingham (1180–1246) was the Bishop of Salisbury from 1229 to 1246.

Bingham held the prebend of Slape in the diocese of Salisbury prior to his election as bishop about 25 September 1228 and was consecrated at Wilton on 27 May 1229.

Bingham died on 2 December or 3 November 1246.

Citations

References
 British History Online Bishops of Salisbury accessed on 30 October 2007
 

1180 births
1246 deaths
Bishops of Salisbury
13th-century English Roman Catholic bishops